Cnemaspis adangrawi, the Adang-Rawi rock gecko, is a species of gecko endemic to Thailand.

References

adangrawi
Reptiles described in 2019
Fauna of Thailand